No. 684 Squadron RAF was a photo-reconnaissance squadron of the Royal Air Force from 1943 to 1946.

History
The squadron was formed on 29 September 1943 at RAF Dum Dum near Calcutta, (then) British India from the twin-engined elements of No. 681 Squadron RAF. It operated in the photo-reconnaissance role with first the de Havilland Mosquito and the North American Mitchell, and later also with the Bristol Beaufighter and the Supermarine Spitfire. The squadron performed long range photo-reconnaissance in support of the Burma Campaign. Near the end of the war the squadron also performed high-speed courier flights. It was disbanded on 1 September 1946 at RAF Seletar, Singapore by being renumbered to No. 81 Squadron RAF.

Aircraft operated

Squadron bases

Commanding officers

See also
List of Royal Air Force aircraft squadrons

References

Notes

Bibliography

External links

 No 671 – 1435 Squadron Histories
 History of 684 Squadron

Military units and formations established in 1943
Aircraft squadrons of the Royal Air Force in World War II
Military units and formations disestablished in 1946
684